"I Did What I Did for Maria" is a song recorded by British singer Tony Christie. It was written and produced by Mitch Murray and Peter Callander, who were also responsible for Christie's "Las Vegas" and "Avenues and Alleyways". The song is about a widower who, on the eve of his execution, recalls how he remorselessly avenged his dead wife, hence the title. It reached number two in the UK Singles Chart in June 1971, and was also a major hit in Ireland, where it also reached number two.  It was a number-one hit in New Zealand, and also peaked at number three in Australia.

The track later appeared on Christie's compilation album, Definitive Collection, which reached number 1 in the UK Albums Chart in 2005.

Paper Lace included this song on their 1974 album, Paper Lace.

References

1971 singles
1971 songs
Tony Christie songs
Songs written by Mitch Murray
Songs written by Peter Callander
Number-one singles in New Zealand